Merzomyia mongolica is a species of tephritid or fruit flies in the genus Merzomyia of the family Tephritidae.

Distribution
Mongolia.

References

Tephritinae
Insects described in 1990
Diptera of Asia